Devoted to You  may refer to:

Devoted to You (film), a 1986 Hong Kong film
"Devoted to You" (song), a 1958 popular song written by Felice and Boudleaux Bryant and popularized by the Everly Brothers

See also
"Hopelessly Devoted to You", a 1977 song recorded by Olivia Newton-John for the movie musical Grease